Oniipa Training School is a teacher training  school in Oniipa, Namibia. It was founded in 1913. The writer Hans Daniel Namuhuja (1924-1998), author of the first novel by a Namibian of African origin, attended the school from 1944 to 1946.

References

Education in Oshikoto Region